Lego Builder's Journey is a puzzle game developed by Light Brick Studio and published by Lego Games. When it first released on December 19, 2019, Lego Builder's Journey was initially an exclusive game for the Apple Arcade service on iOS and macOS; however, the game was subsequently ported to the Nintendo Switch and Microsoft Windows, with these ports both being made available on June 22, 2021. It was also ported to Xbox One and Xbox Series X/S on November 25, 2021. The PlayStation 4 and PlayStation 5 ports of the game released on April 19, 2022. Lego Builder's Journey and Lego Brawls were the first two Lego games for Apple Arcade. Lego Builder's Journey has received generally positive reviews.

Gameplay 
Lego Builder's Journey is a puzzle game. The game allows the players to build their own model and solving puzzles. The game levels are freebuilding. The PlayStation 4 and PlayStation 5 versions included a Creative Mode that players to create and share their own imaginative builds.

Development and release 
The game, originally developed under the title Lego Arthouse, has been described by Lego as "... a narrative journey about play itself, touching deeply on the belief of we only get old because we stop playing. Targeted at a more mature audience, it is an expression of the value of creativity in a coming of age story, set amongst a micro Lego world heavily inspired by our  community." It was the first game developed by Light Brick Studio, Lego Group's own internal video game development studio.

The Windows version of the game uses Nvidia RTX.

Reception 

Lego Builder's Journey received "generally favorable" reviews upon release according to review aggregator Metacritic, the IOS version had 80/100, the PC version had 79/100, the Nintendo Switch version had 76/100 and the PlayStation 5 version had 77/100.

Kate Gray for Nintendo Life gave the game a 7/10 and commented, "Getting back in touch with the pre-manual-following version of yourself is a delight, and having the story be about a parent and a child connecting through child's play is as touching as it is smart. Despite occasional misfires and what can feel like padding, this is a LEGO game which plays with the fundamental philosophy of creativity far more than the average LEGO-branded title, and we hope this is an indication of new games to come."

Alistair Jones for PC Gamer gave the game a 79/100 and commented, "A lifelike and heartfelt celebration of a beloved toy that overreaches in later levels."

Chad Sapieha for Common Sense Media gave the game a four out of five star rating and commented, "This one snag aside, Lego Builder's Journey is a short but beautiful little puzzler that captures the spirit of the iconic toy on which it's founded almost perfectly."

Screen Rant gave the game a 4/5 and stated, "Lego Builder's Journey is an absolute delight overall. With wonderful design choices and a truly calming atmosphere, it's a moment of relaxation that puzzle fans will enjoy. Its simplicity may be a doubled-edge sword at times, but this is exactly the right kind of game for players who want to turn on and switch off."

Accolades

See also 
 Lego Bricktales

References

External links 
 

2019 video games
Apple Arcade games
Golden Joystick Award winners
IOS games
Builder's Journey
MacOS games
Nintendo Switch games
Puzzle video games
Single-player video games
Video games developed in the United States
Windows games
Xbox One games
Xbox Series X and Series S games